Thabang Molefe (born 11 April 1979) is a retired South African football player.

He played for HIT Gorica, Jomo Cosmos, FC Lyn Oslo, Le Mans UC and Orlando Pirates.

Molefe also played for the South Africa national football team and was a participant at the 2002 FIFA World Cup.

During international duty with South Africa, Molefe tackled David Beckham who fell awkwardly in a challenge and was substituted early in the second half of the friendly match before being taken to hospital. Beckham, England captain at the time, suffered a fractured wrist as a result of the challenge.

References

External links

Stats from Slovenia at PrvaLiga official website.

1979 births
Living people
People from Potchefstroom
South African soccer players
South African expatriate soccer players
South Africa international soccer players
2002 FIFA World Cup players
2004 African Cup of Nations players
Association football defenders
ND Gorica players
Expatriate footballers in Slovenia
Jomo Cosmos F.C. players
Lyn Fotball players
Expatriate footballers in Norway
South African expatriate sportspeople in Norway
Le Mans FC players
Ligue 1 players
Ligue 2 players
Expatriate footballers in France
South African expatriate sportspeople in France
Orlando Pirates F.C. players